The 1988 United States presidential election in Washington took place on November 8, 1988. All fifty states and the District of Columbia, were part of the 1988 United States presidential election. Voters chose ten electors to the Electoral College, which selected the president and vice president. The State of Washington was won by Democratic Massachusetts Governor Michael Dukakis, who was running against incumbent Republican Vice President George H. W. Bush of Texas. Dukakis ran with Texas Senator Lloyd Bentsen, and Bush ran with Indiana Senator Dan Quayle.

The presidential election of 1988 was a very partisan election for Washington, with nearly 98% of the electorate voting for either the Democratic or Republican parties. In typical form for the time and political climate in Washington – an East/West split can be seen in the voter turnout: with the coastal counties voting in the majority for Dukakis, and the inland counties voting mainly for Bush.

Dukakis won the election in Washington with a narrow 2-point margin. The close election results in what was at the time a left-leaning swing state is reflective of a nationwide political reconsolidation of base for the Republican Party, which took place through the 1980s. Through the passage of some very controversial economic programs, spearheaded by then President Ronald Reagan (called, collectively, "Reaganomics"), the mid-to-late 1980s saw a period of economic growth and stability. The hallmark for Reaganomics was, in part, the wide-scale deregulation of corporate interests, and tax cuts for the wealthy. Dukakis ran his campaign on a socially liberal platform, and advocated for higher economic regulation and environmental protection. Bush, alternatively, ran on a campaign of continuing the social and economic policies of former President Reagan – which gained him much support with social conservatives and people living in rural areas. Additionally, while the economic programs passed under Reagan, and furthered under Bush and Clinton, may have boosted the economy for a brief period, they are criticized by many analysts as "setting the stage" for economic troubles in the United States after 2007, such as the Great Recession.

Dukakis carried Washington state with 50.05% of the vote to Bush’s 48.46%, a margin of 1.59%, making it the closest state in the election. This made Washington one of ten states (along with the District of Columbia) to vote for Dukakis, even as Bush won a convincing victory nationally. Washington weighed in for this election as over 9% more Democratic than the national average. For decades prior to 1988, Washington had been a swing state, and it had gone Republican in the four preceding elections, even voting for losing Republican candidate Gerald Ford in 1976. But the state’s strong Democratic tilt in 1988 portended the political direction the state would take in the modern era. Dukakis’ 1988 victory began a Democratic winning streak in Washington state that has never been broken since. Washington's Democratic trend was largely driven by the dramatic shift toward the Democrats among urban and suburban voters that began in the 1980s. While Bush won many rural counties, Dukakis won the two most heavily populated counties in Washington state: King County and Pierce County. 

King County, home to the city of Seattle and its surrounding suburbs, was and is by far the most heavily populated county in the state, and a bellwether county for the state as a whole. In every presidential election since Washington achieved statehood, the candidate who won King County also won Washington state as a whole. While the city of Seattle had long leaned Democratic, the surrounding suburbs had long leaned Republican, making King County a swing county, and thus Washington state a swing state. In 1976, moderate Republican Gerald Ford had carried Washington state 50–46, while winning King County 51–45. In the 1984 Republican landslide, Ronald Reagan won King County by a 52–47 margin. However, Michael Dukakis won King County by a 54–45 margin, a raw vote difference of 59,089 votes, providing more than the entire 29,681 raw vote difference by which he carried Washington state as a whole. The 1988 result started a yet-unbroken Democratic winning streak in King County, and would prove to be the start of a long-term dramatic shift toward the Democratic Party in the county and thus in the state as a whole. 

As the city of Seattle grew, and its suburbs continued abandoning the GOP and increasingly trended Democratic in the 1990s and 2000s, King County would be transformed from a swing county prior to 1988 into a Democratic stronghold; twenty years later, in 2008, Democrat Barack Obama would receive over 70% of the vote in King County. The Democratic dominance in King County that began in 1988 would solidify Washington as a strong blue state in the modern era. In the eight presidential elections since 1988, no Republican candidate has replicated the percentages of the vote received by George H.W. Bush in King, Pierce, Snohomish, Kitsap, Island, Whatcom, Skagit, San Juan, or Thurston counties. 

 this is the last election when Kitsap County and Snohomish County have supported the Republican presidential nominee. This also is the last election where the state of Washington was decided by a margin of five points or less. Dukakis and Bush tied in Ferry County. This is the second time in a presidential election in Washington (after 1896) and the last time until Bill Clinton won Georgia in 1992 that two candidates tied in a county.

Results

Results by county

See also
 United States presidential elections in Washington (state)
 Presidency of George H. W. Bush

References

Washington
1988
1988 Washington (state) elections